CJKR-FM is a Canadian radio station broadcasting on the assigned frequency of 97.5 MHz in Winnipeg, Manitoba. It airs an active rock format with the on-air brand name Power 97. The station is owned and operated by Corus Entertainment, which also owns sister stations CJOB and CFPG-FM. The studios and offices are located at 201 Portage Avenue in downtown Winnipeg, while its transmitter is located on Brady Road in south Winnipeg.

CJKR is the most powerful FM radio station in Canada, operating with 310,000 watts. Most FM stations in Canada and the United States run 100,000 watts or less. Because CJKR-FM is one of the oldest FM stations in Canada, it was grandfathered with a much higher power. (In Winnipeg, CBW-FM also operates with an unusually high power, 160,000 watts). Power 97 is simulcast on Shaw Direct channel 860.

History
The station first signed on the air on May 27, 1948 as CJOB-FM, an FM simulcast of CJOB. The station applied to the Board of Broadcast Governors (BBG) to move its broadcast frequency from 103.1 MHz to the current 97.5 MHz. It began airing distinct programming in 1962, featured a country format as CHMM-FM in the late 1970s and early 1980s, and then changed its format to soft rock and its call sign to CKIS-FM in 1984. In the late 1980s, CKIS moved to a rock format, which was not in compliance with its licence at that time. Eventually, the station was allowed to amend its licence, stick with the rock format, and changed its call letters to CJKR-FM in 1991. In the late 2000s, the station moved from mainstream rock to active rock by reducing the classic rock in its playlist, aiming at a youthful male audience.

Changing owners and studios
In 2000, Western International Communications sold its Winnipeg stations to Corus Entertainment. In April 2010, Corus Radio Winnipeg announced the relocation of its radio broadcast facility to 1440 Rapelje Avenue (since renamed Jack Blick Avenue), as part of a lease agreement between Corus Entertainment and Cadillac Fairview. The relocation to Polo Park was scheduled for January 2011. CJOB, CJGV-FM and CJKR-FM would become the anchor tenants. At the time, general manager Garth Buchko said the stations had outgrown their 930 Portage Avenue facility. With the move, Corus Radio Winnipeg would also upgrade to state-of-the-art, fully digital on-air systems. At the end of February 2011, CJKR-FM completed the move to its new location at 1440 Jack Blick Avenue.

As of April 2021, the three stations are again back in downtown Winnipeg at 201 Portage Avenue. It is unknown when they were moved to this current location.

Flip to Classic Rock
At Noon on January 29, 2015, after playing "Fade to Black" by Metallica, CJKR began stunting with liners promoting that Winnipeg would be getting "bigger" the following day at 8 a.m., interspersed between 5-second clips of songs with the word "big" in them. At that time, CJKR flipped to a classic rock format as 97.5 Big FM, putting it in direct competition with long-time classic rock station CITI-FM (although that station still plays current rock songs describing itself as mainstream rock). The first song on "Big" was "Big Time" by Peter Gabriel. The new format was being described as a "homage to Winnipeg's rock heritage", with a playlist that is "familiar, and less predictable and has rock credibility". In November 2015, veteran broadcaster Shadoe Davis was hired for "The Shadoe Davis Show" from 6-10am weekdays. In March, he was joined by another veteran Winnipeg broadcaster, Joe Aiello. "Shadoe & Joe" can now be heard together with traffic reports from Randy Parker and news with Kathy Kennedy.

Return to Active rock
On August 12, 2016, at Noon, after playing "Free Bird" by Lynyrd Skynyrd, CJKR rebranded back to Power 97, and returned to its active rock format. The first song on the newly relaunched "Power" was "Give It Away" by Red Hot Chili Peppers.

On October 5, 2020, it was announced that CJKR will serve as FM co-flagship of the Winnipeg Jets under a seven-year deal with Corus, with games airing in simulcast with sister AM station CJOB.

References

External links
 
 
 

Jkr
Jkr
Jkr
Radio stations established in 1948
1948 establishments in Manitoba